Toc Toc Toc is a Canadian French children's television series. Currently the series airs in Canada on Radio Canada.

Synopsis

Toc Toc Toc invites the young viewer to dive into a playful whimsical and imaginative world that they have fun to explore unknown worlds, and they do a thousand discoveries with all the characters of the series.
Toc Toc Toc is a village surrounded by mountains with houses built from recycled materials a rocket vehicle called Magli and mystery doors that allow Youï Alia Kao and Zalaé to travel around the world and to discover seas, forests, deserts and their mysteries. Thus, full of ideas and propelled by curious minds, our young heroes explore their world exercising their imagination inventing games, songs, adventures that allow them to have fun while learning. Toc Toc Toc has a little nosy mice, Grubule, passionate and welcoming adults ... except Mr. Craquepoutte so strict and hilarious!

External links
 

2007 French television series debuts
2007 Canadian television series debuts
2000s French television series
French children's television series
2000s Canadian children's television series
Ici Radio-Canada Télé original programming